Waging a Living is a 2004 documentary film that addresses the issue of the American dream and whether or not hard work will invariably improve your condition. Examining the lives of four Americans in California and the Northeast who work full-time jobs but are still having trouble making ends meet.

Waging a Living was produced and directed by Roger Weisberg and aired on PBS in 2006 as part of its Point of View series. It was met with high critical acclaim, winning Best Documentary at the New Jersey Film Festival and receiving a 92% "Fresh" rating on Rotten Tomatoes.

References

External links 
 P.O.V. Waging a Living - PBS's site dedicated to the film
 
 

2005 films
POV (TV series) films
Documentary films about poverty in the United States
2000s English-language films
2000s American films